The Croydon Natural History & Scientific Society (CNHSS) is a cultural society based in Croydon, south London, that concerns itself with the local history, archaeology, natural history and geology of the London Borough of Croydon and adjacent areas. It was founded in 1870; and is a registered charity (no 260739).

History
The society was founded as the Croydon Microscopical Club in 1870. It changed its name in 1877 to the Croydon Microscopical and Natural History Club; and again in 1902 to the present Croydon Natural History & Scientific Society. It was incorporated as a company in 1967; and was registered as a charity in 1970.

Activities
The society holds a regular programme of lecture meetings, field meetings and excursions. It maintains a library and a museum, and publishes a journal.

Sections
Informal sections of the society include the Ornithology Group and the Entomology Section.

Publications
Since its foundation, the society has published a regular journal, titled Proceedings, which normally appears annually and contains between one and three substantial articles on local history or other topics within the society's sphere of interest. Since 1967 it has also published a more frequent Bulletin, which is now issued three times a year: two of these issues contain a variety of shorter articles and news items, while the third contains formal papers submitted for the annual general meeting. It has published a number of illustrated local history books, and other miscellaneous publications.

Premises and museum
The society's headquarters, registered office and library building, purchased in 1966, is at 96a, Brighton Road, South Croydon. The museum (which is open only on an occasional basis, or by appointment) is housed in separate premises at Chipstead Valley Primary School.

Emblem
The society's emblem is a representation of a 5th- or 6th-century bronze openwork disc in a triskelion design, probably a girdle ornament or amulet, which was found in 1893 in an Anglo-Saxon cemetery in Edridge Road, Croydon. The original object can now be seen in the Riesco Gallery of the Museum of Croydon.

References

External links

1870 establishments in England
Organizations established in 1870
Historical societies of the United Kingdom
Archaeology of England
Archaeological organizations
History of London
Archaeology of London
History of the London Borough of Croydon
Museums in the London Borough of Croydon
Local museums in London
Culture in the London Borough of Croydon
History organisations based in London
Scientific societies based in the United Kingdom